Tainá "Caveira" Pereira is a fictional player character who appears in the 2015 video game Tom Clancy's Rainbow Six Siege, a tactical online first-person shooter that was developed by Ubisoft Montreal. Caveira was introduced in Operation Skull Rain, the game's third season, which was released on August 6, 2016. She also appears as a crossover DLC character in Tom Clancy's Ghost Recon Wildlands, and in other video games published by French video game publisher Ubisoft, including the crossover title Tom Clancy's Elite Squad. Caveira is voiced by Renata Eastlick.

In Rainbow Six Siege lore, Caveira is known as an interrogator who is working for Batalhão de Operações Policiais Especiais (BOPE), the police tactical unit of the Military Police of Rio de Janeiro State (PMERJ) in Brazil. Originally from a small town near São Paulo, Caveira was arrested as a robbery suspect at age 16. Her criminal profile allowed her to choose between entering a juvenile reformatory or working with BOPE.

Within the game, Caveira has access to a "Luison", a custom semi-automatic pistol fitted with subsonic ammunition that takes down enemies rather than killing them. While enemies are down, Caveira can interrogate them and if successful, the position and identities of all enemy operators are revealed for 9 seconds. She also has the ability to "Silent Step", allowing her to move discreetly across the game's map.

Development and release
While developing Caveira, a team of Ubisoft developers would watch documentaries about the interrogation techniques and sequences that BOPE performed onto a person. These included waterboarding, putting a bucket over their head and beating it, and putting a knife to their throat. The team settled on the latter, as well as an additional stealth-focused skill to sneak around. Alexander Karpazis, Ubisoft's art director, explained this in a video produced by American magazine Wired, detailing that the techniques used in the documentaries were "absolutely brutal". He further asserted that the in-game interrogation was a toned-down version of its real-life counterpart.

Release
On August 2, 2016, Ubisoft released Operation Skull Rain, the third free expansion pack for Rainbow Six Siege for Season Pass owners. The expansion pack included two operators from Brazil's special police force BOPE including Caveira—a stealth-focused operator. She is voiced by Brazilian actress Renata Eastlick. In late September 2018, Ubisoft announced it was lowering the price for all Year One operators, including Caveira, to 40% of their original costs.

Post-release
Rainbow Six Siege's Update 4.3 adjusted Caveira's interrogation mechanics, fixing an exploit that would prevent players from denying an interrogation by leaving the match mid-way through the process. With the update, Caveira automatically completes an interrogation if the other player leaves.

The Operation Velvet Shell expansion, released on February 8, 2017, introduced Spanish operator Jackal was released as a counter towards roaming operators, with editors for PCGamesN and PC Gamer noting him as a counter to Caveira.

In mid-January 2019, Ubisoft implemented a nerf for Caveira in its technical test server, which decreased the damage, adjusted the damage fall-off, lowered the magazine size, increased recoil and increased hip-fire spread for her Luison pistol. The nerf was later implemented into the main game in late January 2019 as part of the Y3S4.2 update. Ubisoft stated the nerf's purpose was to make her "less frustrating to play against and reduce her power level at low to medium levels", as well as attempting to normalise the Luison to be more consistent with the other pistols in the game. The Operation Burnt Horizon expansion, which was released on March 6, 2019, fixed the Luison's fire rate, which was lower than intended.

In February 2019, Rainbow Six Siege YouTuber Get_Flanked posted a video showing an exploit with Caveira's "Silent Step" ability, demonstrating that crouching while using the ability would lower her from a third-person perspective lower than her first-person perspective, giving her a potential advantage in firefights.

In late 2019, Ubisoft changed the damage dealt by Caveira's M12 submachine gun, increasing its output from 36 to 40 damage per bullet. The buff was implemented in the technical test server during November 2019 and was implemented into the Operation Shifting Tides expansion, released a month later, on December 2, 2019. It was changed as Ubisoft wanted players to use the gun, as they would only use her Luison pistol.

Attributes

Personality
During Caveira's psychological evaluation conducted by Dr Harishva "Harry" Pandey, Director of Rainbow, she presented herself as fearless and intelligent. She tends to be daring during operations and isn't the one to think before she reacts, only caring about getting the job done. Harry stated that she had been denied commendations due to her rebellious nature. She told him that she is a "survivor", which is why she continued once her mandatory sentence had ended; she explained it as a "way of life" rather than "a way out". Despite this, she is defiant and "up against the system". She is known to tease other operators for their "superhero sense of justice".

Caveira has a very close relationship with her siblings, though she often had to fight to be heard or noticed. Her family dynamics with her brothers led to being criticised for being too blunt. She is comfortable with noise and spontaneity because of her dynamics and understands group dynamics better than other people her age. Caveira refused to disclose her private life during the evaluation; Harry believed that, instead of slighting him, she was protecting someone close. Harry concluded the evaluation by categorising her as someone who could not be anticipated or predicted and wrote that he had faith in her poise and inner focus and trusted her to do "the right thing".

Danish operator Nøkk studied Caveira, saying how impressed she was by Caveira's ability to be silent while "on the prowl". She noted that what makes her so fast and silent being "talent and survival" alongside past experiences. Nøkk concluded her study by stating that it would take a lifetime to learn from Caveira. By her fellow operators, Caveira is considered to be one of Rainbow's best interrogators, but tends to get carried away with her work.

Caveira is known to work with other operators. Her relationship with American Rainbow operator Meghan "Valkyrie" Castellano has been mounting tensions since Operation Archangel in Bolivia. Canadian Rainbow operator Tina Lin "Frost" Tsang has been assigned to continually work with "other strong personalities" such as Caveira to improve the former's ability to self-actualise. Her relationship with French Rainbow operator Emmanuelle "Twitch" Pichon has been dubious; During Operation Archangel, Twitch conversed with Caveira about how they "have to go out more", though Caveira didn't want her to get into trouble. While in Bolivia, Ghost team leader Nomad found a picture of Caveira with a man in an apartment and presented it to Twitch. Nomad suggested the man was an ex-boyfriend or former lover, though Twitch quickly denied this and refused to explain.

Outward appearance
Caveira wears face paint which resembles a skull and military clothing. Caveira stands about 1.77 metres (5ft 10in) tall and weighs 72 kilograms (160lb).

From July 2 to 16, 2019, Caveira and other operators, were made playable for the in-game event Showdown. The event's featured operators were given Western-style clothing; their gadgets and abilities were removed and their weapons were restricted to the BOSG 12.2 shotgun and the Magnum LFP586 revolver.

Caveira has received unique cosmetic skins for her uniform and weaponry. Between September 16 to October 16, 2019, users could claim an exclusive outfit and weapon skin if they linked their Twitch Prime to their UPlay account. In August 2019, Ubisoft announced that she would receive a themed outfit to support American Esports team Faze Clan as part of the game's Pilot Program.

Ubisoft unveiled a teaser trailer for an event to coincide the Six Invitational 2020 at the end of its Rainbow Six Pro League panel. Caveira, among other operators, were showcased in the trailer wearing Olympics-style sports clothing themed to their respective nations. An in-game event, which takes place within a restored stadium in Greece, was revealed and released in mid-January 2020. It gave players the ability to unlock limited-time skins for Caveira's headgear, uniform, and submachine gun.

Elite skin

In late-October 2019, an Elite skin set for Caveira was leaked by RolyNoly1 on Twitter, who has previously leaked previous cosmetics and the in-game Doktor's Curse Halloween event. The skin's official unveiling was on February 15, 2020, as the "Mata-Leão", a reference to the rear-naked choke submission popular in Brazilian jiu-jitsu. It was released on February 20, before Rainbow Six Siege's first season of its fifth year, Operation Void Edge.

The skin departed from the character's skull face paint and military gear, changing to casual sporting attire consisting of a crimson-coloured crop top and gloves, high-rise denim pants, and hand wraps. She also gained weapon skins for her Luison, M12, and SPAS-15 firearms, coloured in a similar red colour palette to her Elite uniform. Fans compared the skin's appearance to Chloe Frazer and Lara Croft from the video game series' Uncharted and Tomb Raider respectively.

Appearances

Tom Clancy's Rainbow Six Siege

Biography
She was born to a widowed mother on October 15, 1989, in Rinópolis, Brazil as the seventh in a family of ten boys. After moving to Rio de Janeiro at a young age, she got arrested for robbery. She was given a choice between entering the Fundação Estadual para o Bem-Estar do Menor (FEBEM) juvenile reformatory or working with BOPE with the Polícia Militar as a criminal informant.

Caveira worked for years within various gangs, which made her skilled in interrogation techniques and surveillance. She now frequently conducts interrogation training exercises within the Brazilian police force. She excels in confined environment tactics, extraction, and extreme risk situations. Her work during the Rio de Janeiro Security Crisis brought the attention of Team Rainbow, though she is considered a dangerous, free-roaming operator. She was trained while in the Unidade de Polícia Pacificadora (UPP) and Polícia Militar do Estado do Rio de Janeiro (PMERJ) and has experience in Deep-Interrogation training.

Caveira's past experiences include the Rio de Janeiro Security Crisis, the Assault on Complexo do Alemão, Operation Skull Rain, and Operation Archangel. She was part of a highly classified operation that had gone awry, code-named Operation Patriots. She briefly touched on during a car ride conversation with Ghost team leader Nomad, stating that she would not share any details on the operation, even with a knife to her throat. Operation Patriots is a reference to the cancelled video game Tom Clancy's Rainbow 6: Patriots, which became the basis for Rainbow Six Siege

Not much is known outside of Caveira's professional work, except that she enjoys learning languages and fights in unofficial Jiu-Jitsu tournaments.

Gameplay

In Rainbow Six Siege, Caveira is classified as a defensive operator. She has a skill called "Silent Step" that allows her to move quietly for a short time before needing to recharge, allowing her to sneak up on enemies to immobilise them and take them down. While an enemy is down, Caveira can interrogate them and, if done successfully, the position and identity of every enemy operator will be compromised for a short time. Her Silent Step skill could be active for up to ten seconds before needing to recharge. While it is activated, Caveira's stance is lowered to show that she is in stealth mode.

Caveira's firearms consist of either a Beretta M12 submachine gun or a Franchi SPAS-15 semi-automatic shotgun as primary weapons and a specialised Taurus PT92 nicknamed "Luison" as a secondary weapon. The semi-automatic pistol is equipped with a custom suppressor and fitted with subsonic ammunition that takes down enemies rather than killing them. The Luison's silencer is wrapped in a rock-based mineral fibre to help insulate and soundproof. Her original gadgets were a Nitrocellulose (nitro cell) C-4 explosive and barbed wire. The nitro cell was later replaced with impact grenades and the barbed wire with a bulletproof camera.

Caveira is a roaming operator; intended for players who stay out of the objective room to take out unsuspecting attackers. Though she has a lower pick rate compared to other operators, she has a high-win rate because of her playstyle. Anti-roamers and area-denial operators such as Gridlock, Dokkaebi, Nomad, and Lion can counter her. She can counter Jackal, who is unable to track Caveira's footsteps while her Silent Step skill is active.

Tom Clancy's Ghost Recon Wildlands

On July 24, 2018, Ubisoft released Operation Archangel, the second Special Operation DLC for the 2017 tactical shooter Tom Clancy's Ghost Recon Wildlands. The DLC featured Caveira, alongside fellow Rainbow Six operators Valkyrie and Twitch.

In the DLC, A Ghost Recon fireteam picks up an alert signal leading to a crashed vehicle surrounded by dead cartel members. Team leader Nomad calls in the situation and is patched through to Rainbow operator Valkyrie, who suspects that the crash scene may be the work of a Rainbow operator who recently went off-grid and tracked to Bolivia. Valkyrie sends Nomad to meet with operator Twitch, who explains that Caveira was being trailed by the two but was lost while in Bolivia. Twitch goes to the scene and concludes that Caveira was there, as indicated by a knife wound to one of the cartel member's neck.

The fireteam travel to a nearby camp—where the crashed vehicle came from—and find all stationed cartel members dead. Nomad interrogates the camp manager, who tells them that the truck was carrying banknotes worth a months profit and was stolen by "Dengoso". He tells Nomad that "The Devil" killed everyone before he could call in reinforcements before asking the whereabouts of Dengoso. The manager informed her that Dengoso had stolen the truck. Bowman, the fireteam's Central Intelligence Agency (CIA) contact, and Valkyrie discover that Dengoso is an undercover Brazilian Policia Federal agent who infiltrated the Santa Blanca cartel.

The fireteam goes to Dengoso's apartment and plays a message on his answering machine that reveals he is Caveira's brother; she had travelled to Bolivia to save him from the Santa Blanca cartel and discovered he is being held captive at a Chemical Institute. The fireteam meets up with Caveira to extract her, though she refuses until she frees Dengoso. After he is, Bowman demands Dengoso to give her intel on El Sueno, leader of the Santa Blanca cartel; He refuses as she is not his superior. Bowman threatens to interrogate him, though immediately retracts her statements after Caveira intervenes. Dengoso tells Bowman that he would give her what he knows if his superiors permit him. Caveira prompts Dengoso to leave with her after Bowman grows frustrated that the intel would be useless by the time clearance is given.

Other appearances
Caveira appeared in the CGI animated short film Tournament of Champions. The short tells the story of a match between a team of attackers and defenders. At the start of Caveira's post-game interview, she delivers a death stare to the camera. During the match, she engaged Thatcher in hand-to-hand combat but was shot in the head by Dokkaebi. Frustrated, she argues to Mozzie that they don't get another chance and that they "fucked it up"; during her interview, she tells Harry that "no one remembers who comes in second." After the match, she walks out to the stadium crowd, who chant her name. Caveira tells Harry that she will "absolutely" return the next year to compete.

At the 2019 Electronic Entertainment Expo, Ubisoft announced the release of Tom Clancy's Elite Squad, a free-to-play mobile RPG. The game features Caveira and other Tom Clancy's characters, including Sam Fisher from the Splinter Cell franchise, Nomad from Ghost Recon, Megan from The Division, and fellow Rainbow Six Siege operator Montagne.

Cultural impact

Reception
In listing every operator in Rainbow Six Siege, Game Rant placed Caveira seventh, suggesting that coordinated teams aren't likely to have issues playing against her while newer players would. In a similar listing, Gamespur put the character as the third-best defender, highlighting that it would be best not to overuse her as it would lead to being countered by opponents who pick anti-roamers in response. Morgan Park of PC Gamer listed Caveira in the "viable, but not essential" category alongside other defensive operators including Warden, Maestro, Kapkan and Frost, calling her useless against multiple enemies at once but effective if an enemy is alone. 

In an article for VG247, Mitch Lineham placed her as the 5th best defender, below Rook, Doc, Mute, and Jäger, calling her "one of the scariest Operators to go against", but noted that she isn't "too hard to win against in a gunfight." While reviewing her gameplay changes in the Operation Burnt Horizon expansion, Rock, Paper, Shotgun'''s Dave Irwin said Caveira is more than a "mere nuisance to the enemy team" because she is the "go-to assassin" of the Rainbow Six Siege roster, stating that she is "so deadly in the right hands". Jonathan Leack of GameRevolution considered her a "C-tier" operator, writing that although she is "very hard" in terms of difficulty, she is an "interesting choice" to play because the timing and coordination required makes her "a risky choice"; Leack also called her "very fun to play but largely ineffective when compared to other options".

In 2019, Ubisoft introduced a pick-and-ban system to the Rainbow Six Pro League, allowing players to choose several operators and ban them from play for the match. The company later introduced this system to the public in the competitive, ranked, game mode. Alongside Blitz, Jackal, and Echo, Caveira is one of the operators most commonly banned by the system. While answering questions in an Ask Me Anything on Reddit, The Rainbow Six Siege balancing team responded to a user who asked about the current state of Caveira, responding that they consider her to be well-balanced.

 Cosplay 
American internet personality Meg Turney shared multiple photos of her cosplaying as Caveira on the social media platform Instagram. One of the images released depicted her in a black lingerie set while another portrayed her in Caveira's full military outfit. Another photo, which featured Turney in a bikini, garnered over 13,500 likes and 100 comments within one hour of being posted. 

Various other cosplayers have dressed themselves up as Caveira, notably Alex Zedra and Narine Fox. Ubisoft featured the latter as part of their Creative Spotlight segment. In November 2018, Ubisoft announced the winners of their low-budget cosplay contest, which included a father-daughter duo dressing as operators Buck and Caveira respectively.

Controversy

On November 2, 2018, Ubisoft announced it was changing Rainbow Six Siege'' to have a "single, global version" that would make development more efficient. References to gambling, sex, and violence would be removed and changes to the user interface elements such as the icons for melee, death, and friendly fire would be made to comply with regulations of Asian countries. Other elements that were planned to be removed include graphical elements such as slot machines, skull graffiti, blood spray, and a neon sign of a dancing woman.

Caveira was often used in arguments against the changes; she wears skull-themed face paint and her name translates from Portuguese as "skull". Some of the planned changes included references to skulls and graphical representations of skulls, leading players to argue the changes were inconsistent. Ubisoft later announced it was reversing the changes following a community backlash.

References

External links
Caveira's profile at publisher's homepage

Female characters in video games
Fictional Brazilian jiu-jitsu practitioners
Fictional special forces personnel
Fictional Brazilian people in video games
Fictional police officers in video games
Fictional torturers and interrogators
Fictional secret agents and spies in video games
Fictional martial artists in video games
Fictional military personnel in video games
Video game characters introduced in 2016
Video game controversies
Tom Clancy characters
Ubisoft characters
Woman soldier and warrior characters in video games
Fictional LGBT characters